A shepherd's dial (also known as a pillar dial or cylinder) is a type of sundial that measures the height of the sun via the so-called umbra versa. Its design needs to incorporate a fixed latitude, but it is small and portable. It is named after Pyrenean shepherds, who would trace such a sundial on their staffs. This type of sundial was very popular in the 16th, 17th, and 18th centuries.

History
Such sundials did not need aligning north-south and so became very popular, appearing in Renaissance artworks such as Holbein's 1528 Portrait of Nicolaus Kratzer and his 1533 The Ambassadors.

Concept

Characteristics

Variants 

A Slovenian shepherd's dial is a flat dial in the shape of a sector of a circle. It is hung vertically and measures the altitude of the sun. A movable peg adjusts for the changing seasons.

References 

Sundials